Mátyás Kuti is a Hungarian Rubik's Cube and Rubik's Magic solver. During 2007 and 2008 he held world records in many events. However, in February 2008, after determining that he had cheated in blindfolded events by peeking at the cube, the World Cube Association revoked all of his blindfold records and banned him for three years from WCA competitions.

World records formerly held
 Rubik's Magic Single
 Rubik's Magic Average
 Master Magic Single
 Master Magic Average
 2x2x2 Cube Single
 2x2x2 Cube Average
 4x4x4 Cube Single
 4x4x4 Cube Average
 5x5x5 Cube Single
 5x5x5 Cube Average
 Square One Average
 Rubik's Clock Average

External links

Living people
Hungarian speedcubers
Year of birth missing (living people)